Mulewa Dharmichand (born 4 April 1984) is an Indian born Singaporean cricketer. A right-handed batsman and off spin bowler, he has played for the Singapore national cricket team since 2004, having previously played Under-19 Test matches for India Under-19s and first-class cricket for Karnataka.

Biography
Born in Rajasthan in 1984, Mulewa Dharmichand played for Karnataka at Under-16, Under-19 and Under-22 levels before making his first-class debut for them in a Ranji Trophy match against Tamil Nadu in November 2000. He played three Test matches for India Under-19s against England Under-19s in January 2001.

He played his only List A match for Karnataka against Goa in January 2002, and his first-class career with them came to an end in November that year with Ranji Trophy matches against Maharashtra and Bihar.

He first played for Singapore in the Stan Nagaiah Trophy series against Malaysia in 2004, playing in the event again the following two years. He played in the ACC Trophy in Kuala Lumpur in 2006, and in the Saudara Cup match against Malaysia the same year.

In 2007, he played in the Saudara Cup match and in the ACC Twenty20 Cup, whilst in 2008 he played in the Stan Nagaiah Trophy series, Division Five of the World Cricket League in Jersey, and most recently represented his adopted country in the 2008 ACC Trophy, where he played in the fifth place play-off against Malaysia.

References

1984 births
Living people
Rajasthan cricketers
Indian cricketers
Singaporean cricketers
Karnataka cricketers
People from Pali, Rajasthan
Cricketers from Rajasthan
Indian emigrants to Singapore
Southeast Asian Games gold medalists for Singapore
Southeast Asian Games silver medalists for Singapore
Southeast Asian Games medalists in cricket
Competitors at the 2017 Southeast Asian Games